Teychenné is a surname. Notable people with the surname include: 

Gabriella Teychenné, English music conductor
Michel Teychenné, French politician
 Anais Teychenné, mayor of Sentenac-de-Sérou, France
 Charles Twynam Teychenne, a recipient of the Military Cross (MC) in the 1917 New Year Honours
 Jean-Marie (Jean-Michel?) Teychenne, a cyclist in the 1907 Tour de France
 Kathleen Teychenne, a recipient of the British Empire Medal (BEM) in the 1974 Birthday Honours
 Maree Teychenne, Australian author, scriptwriter for two episodes on the first season of Prisoner, and received an ACT Writing and Publishing Awards 
 Mathieu Teychenne, a cyclist in the 2012 Ag2r–La Mondiale season 
 V.G. Teychenné, a principal at Perseverance School, Kimberley, South Africa
 Victor Teychenne, a former footballer with  Birmingham City F.C.